Rouen-Les-Essarts was a  motor racing circuit in Orival, near Rouen, France.

From its opening in 1950, Rouen-Les-Essarts was recognized as one of Europe's finest circuits, with modern pits, a wide track, and spectator grandstands.

Rouen hosted five Formula One French Grand Prix races, the last one in 1968 resulting in the tragic burning death of Jo Schlesser, at the fast downhill Six Frères curve. The circuit continued to host major Formula 2 events until 1978, after which it was used for various French Championships.

The circuit had a number of different configurations. Finally, in 1974 a permanent chicane was built at Six Frères and this part of the circuit was renamed Des Roches.

The circuit was closed down in 1994 due to economic and safety reasons, since it is very hard to organize a race on public roads if modern safety standards are to be met. In 1999, following the circuit's closure all evidence of area's racing past was demolished, including grandstands, pits, Armco and track signs. The cobbled Nouveau Monde hairpin was also asphalted but it is still possible to drive around on the original circuit configuration.

The name "Les Essarts" comes from a village, which was included into the commune of Grand-Couronne in 1874.

Lap records
The official race lap records at the Rouen-Les-Essarts are listed as:

References

External links
 Rouen-Les-Essarts - France's Forgotten Treasure Remembered
 Satellite picture by Google Maps
 Rouen Seine valley Tourist Board's Website

Formula One circuits
Grand Prix motorcycle circuits
Sports venues in Seine-Maritime
French Grand Prix
Grand Prix de Rouen-les-Essarts
Defunct motorsport venues in France